Päri is a village in Viljandi Parish, Viljandi County, Estonia. It has a population of 496 (as of 4 January 2010).

Viljandi Airfield (ICAO: EEVI) is located in Päri.

References

Villages in Viljandi County
Kreis Fellin